Crookshank is a surname, and may refer to:

 Anne Crookshank (1927–2016), Irish art historian
 Chichester Crookshank (1868–1958), British Army officer and Unionist Member of Parliament
 Edgar Crookshank (1858–1928), English physician and microbiologist
 Francis Graham Crookshank (1873–1933), British physician and author
 Harry Crookshank (1893–1961), British Conservative politician

See also
Crookshanks
Cruikshank (disambiguation)